Rheinböllen is a former Verbandsgemeinde ("collective municipality") in the Rhein-Hunsrück district, in Rhineland-Palatinate, Germany. Its seat was in Rheinböllen. On 1 January 2020 it was merged into the new Verbandsgemeinde Simmern-Rheinböllen.

The Verbandsgemeinde Rheinböllen consisted of the following Ortsgemeinden ("local municipalities"):

 Argenthal
 Benzweiler
 Dichtelbach
 Ellern
 Erbach
 Kisselbach
 Liebshausen
 Mörschbach
 Rheinböllen
 Riesweiler
 Schnorbach
 Steinbach

Former Verbandsgemeinden in Rhineland-Palatinate